Kodomonokuni Theme Park (こどもの国) is an amusement park near Tokyo, located in Yokohama, Japan. The park's name means Children's Country. As the name implies, it is more oriented towards young children than teenagers. It was founded in commemoration of the Royal Marriage of Prince Akihito and Princess Michiko in 1959 (who reigned as Emperor and Empress from 1989 to 2019), and it was officially opened on May 5, a national holiday of the Children's Day, in 1965.

It can be accessed by train from the Tokyu Corporation's Kodomonokuni Line, Kodomonokuni Station, or from Aobadai Station or Tsurukawa Station by bus.

References

External links
 Kodomonokuni website in English

Amusement parks in Japan
Buildings and structures in Yokohama
Tourist attractions in Yokohama
Animal theme parks